Ahmed Kamal El Trbi (born 6 June 1992) is a Libyan professional footballer who plays as a centre-back for Kuwaiti club Kazma and the Libya national team. Ahmed helped Libya win the 2014 African Nations Championship, Libya's first championship.

Personal life
El Tribi is a medical student in Benghazi.

References

External links
 
 
 

1992 births
Living people
Libyan footballers
Libya international footballers
Association football central defenders
Al-Ahli SC (Tripoli) players
Libyan expatriate footballers
Expatriate footballers in Jordan
Libyan expatriate sportspeople in Jordan
Jordanian Pro League players
Al-Salt SC players
Kazma SC players
Kuwait Premier League players
Expatriate footballers in Kuwait
Libyan expatriate sportspeople in Kuwait
Libyan Premier League players
Libya A' international footballers
2014 African Nations Championship players
Libyan expatriate sportspeople in Egypt
Expatriate footballers in Egypt
2018 African Nations Championship players